United States vs. Reality Winner is a 2021 American documentary film, directed and produced by Sonia Kennebeck. Wim Wenders serves as an executive producer. It follows Reality Winner, who leaked a top secret document about Russian interference in the 2016 United States elections to the media.

The film had its world premiere at South by Southwest on March 17, 2021.

Synopsis
The film follows Reality Winner, who leaked a document about Russian interference in the 2016 United States elections to the media. Winner, Billie Winner-Davis, Brittany Winner, Gary Davis, Betsy Reed, Edward Snowden, John Kiriakou, and Thomas Drake appear in the film, while Natalia Dyer narrates letters and poems by Winner.

Release
The film had its world premiere at South by Southwest on March 17, 2021. It will also screen at CPH:DOX in April 2021.

Reception
United States vs. Reality Winner received positive reviews from film critics. It holds a 100% approval rating on review aggregator website Rotten Tomatoes, based on 12 reviews, with a weighted average of 7.00/10.

References

External links
 
 

2021 films
2021 documentary films
American documentary films
Biographical documentary films
Documentary films about elections in the United States
Films about whistleblowing
2020s English-language films
2020s American films